Nana Best is a special compilation album featuring the combined words of Anna Tsuchiya and Olivia used in the first season of the Nana anime . The album was released in two versions, CD+DVD and the low priced CD only version. The albums were released only one month after the release of two full-albums dedicated solely to one singer each's work for the anime respectively. The first press of the CD+DVD version includes a special Nana mouse pad as well as a "skeleton"-style sleeve package. The best album features five tracks that solely appear on the best album, namely "Stand By Me" - the fifth ED theme for Nana by Anna Tsuchiya, Tsuchiya's cover of the Sex Pistols`s Anarchy in the U.K., a "Studio Live Version" of Tsuchiya's Lucy, a new song from Olivia called "Nothing's Gonna Take Me Love" and finally a live recording of the song "Recorded Butterflies" by Olivia. The DVD features all of the opening and ending sequences used in Nana without credits overtop of them, as well as four "original animation" clips set to music throughout the show. This album was released one week before the airing of the final episode of the first season of the Nana anime.

Track listing 

 Anna Tsuchiya Inspi' Nana (Black Stones) - 1, 3, 6, 7, 8, 11, 12
 Olivia Inspi' Reira (Trapnest) - 2, 4, 5, 9, 10, 13, 14

 Anna Tsuchiya Inspi' Nana (Black Stones) - 1, 5, 6, 7, 9, 10
 Olivia Inspi' Reira (Trapnest) - 2, 3, 4, 8, 11, 12

External links
Oricon Profile

Anna Tsuchiya albums
2007 compilation albums
Olivia Lufkin albums
Avex Group compilation albums
2007 video albums
Avex Group video albums